Clara Brown (–1885) was a former slave and a community leader.

Clara Brown may also refer to:

Clara Brown (steamboat), a sternwheel steamboat of the Puget Sound Mosquito Fleet
Clara Brown, fictional character in Ghost played by Armelia McQueen
Clara Brown (sloop), on National Register of Historic Places listings in Buffalo, New York
Clara Brown (cyclist) (born 1995), American para cyclist

See also
Claire Brown (disambiguation)

Brown, Clara